The 2016–17 South West Peninsula League season was the tenth in the history of the South West Peninsula League, a football competition in England, that feeds the Premier Division of the Western Football League. The league had been formed in 2007 from the merger of the Devon County League and the South Western League, and is restricted to clubs based in Cornwall and Devon. The Premier Division of the South West Peninsula League is on the same level of the National League System as the Western League Division One.

The constitution was announced on 21 May 2016.

Premier Division

The Premier Division featured 20 teams, the same as the previous season, after Stoke Gabriel were relegated to Division One East, and Elburton Villa were relegated to Division One West. 

Two new clubs joined the league:
Plymouth Argyle Reserves, promoted from Division One West.
Tiverton Town Reserves, promoted from Division One East.
Reserve sides are not eligible for promotion to Step 5.

 Only Exmouth Town and Plymouth Parkway applied for promotion to Step 5.

With the news that Tiverton Town Reserves were resigning from the league for financial reasons at the end of the season, only one club would be relegated from the Premier Division. Also, as only three clubs satisfied the requirements for promotion from the feeder leagues, only two clubs were relegated from Division One level.

League table

Division One East
Division One East featured 18 clubs, the same as the previous season, after Tiverton Town Reserves were promoted to the Premier Division, Okehampton Argyle were relegated, and two new clubs joined:

Stoke Gabriel, relegated from the Premier Division.
Torridgeside, promoted from the North Devon League.

Crediton United, Newton Abbot Spurs and Stoke Gabriel applied for promotion to the Premier Division. Newton Abbot Spurs failed the ground grading.

Division One West
Division One West featured 18 clubs, increased from 17 the previous season, after Plymouth Argyle Reserves were promoted to the Premier Division, and two new clubs joined:

Elburton Villa, relegated from the Premier Division.
Plymouth Marjon, promoted from the Plymouth and West Devon League.

Elburton Villa, Porthleven, St Dennis and Sticker applied for promotion to the Premier Division. Elburton Villa and Porthleven failed the ground grading.

Promotion from feeder leagues for 2017–18
Several clubs have applied for promotion to the SWPL for the 2017–18 season. Their success will depend on finishing in the top three in their respective leagues and other factors including ground facilities. Only one club per league can be accepted. If two or more clubs satisfy all requirements and are considered of equal merit, the league board will decide on which club(s) to accept.

The following clubs have applied for promotion to Division One East and West for next season, and have either passed or failed the ground grading process:
Cornwall Combination – Ludgvan (passed / promoted)
Devon & Exeter Football League – Heavitree United (failed), Honiton Town (passed / promoted), Newtown (passed)
East Cornwall League – Bere Alston United (failed)
North Devon Football League – Braunton (passed), Ilfracombe Town (passed / promoted)
South Devon Football League – Buckland Athletic Reserves (passed but depended on the first team being promoted to Step 4, which they failed to do), Waldon Athletic (failed)

References

External links
 South West Peninsula League

South West Peninsula League
10